Bernard Yack (born 1952) is a Canadian born American political theorist.

He received his B.A. from the University of Toronto and his Ph.D. in Philosophy from Harvard University, where he was a student of Judith Shklar. Yack has taught at numerous universities including Princeton University and the University of Wisconsin–Madison. He is the author of works of political and social philosophy such as The Problems of a Political Animal, and The Longing for Total Revolution: The Philosophic Sources of Social Discontent from Rousseau to Marx and Nietzsche. His most recent book is titled Nationalism and the Moral Psychology of Community.  He is currently the Lerman Neubauer Professor of Democracy and Public Policy at Brandeis University.

Selected publications

Yack, Bernard. Nationalism and the Moral Psychology of Community. Chicago: University of Chicago Press, 2012.

Yack, Bernard. The Fetishism of Modernities: Epochal Self-Consciousness in Contemporary Social and Political Thought. University of Notre Dame Press, 1997.

Yack, Bernard. Liberalism without Illusions: Essays on Liberal Theory and the Political Vision of Judith N. Shklar. University of California Press, 1996.

Yack, Bernard. The Problems of a Political Animal: Community, Conflict, and Justice in Aristotelian Political Thought. University of California Press, 1993.

Yack, Bernard. The Longing for Total Revolution: Philosophic Sources of Social Discontent from Rousseau to Marx and Nietzsche. Princeton University Press, 1986.

References

External links
Brandeis University page

1952 births
University of Toronto alumni
Harvard Graduate School of Arts and Sciences alumni
Scholars of nationalism
Moral psychology
Canadian political philosophers
Brandeis University faculty
Princeton University faculty
Living people
Jewish philosophers
20th-century Canadian philosophers
21st-century Canadian philosophers